The Pakistan Super League is a professional Twenty20 cricket league, founded by the Pakistan Cricket Board on 9 September 2015. The league comprises six teams, with matches being held in February and March.

In the first season, matches were played in stadiums across the United Arab Emirates. In the second season, the league's final was held in Lahore, Pakistan. The following season, the league's playoffs and final were held in the Pakistani cities of Karachi and Lahore. In 2019, the last eight matches of the fourth season were played in Pakistan.

The entire league was held in Pakistan for the first time in 2020, however it was struck by COVID-19 pandemic and had to be postponed.

Venues

United Arab Emirates 

 Dubai: The Dubai International Cricket Stadium was the first stadium to host PSL matches, holding a capacity of 25,000. The stadium has held 60 league matches and five ceremonies.
 Sharjah: The Sharjah Cricket Stadium, also known as the Sharjah Cricket Association Stadium, was the second stadium to host PSL matches. The stadium has held 40 PSL matches, but no ceremonies have been held in the stadium. Its capacity was increased in 2019, from 14,000 to 17,000, to better accommodate PSL matches.
 Abu Dhabi: The Sheikh Zayed Cricket Stadium is in Abu Dhabi, with a capacity of 20,000. The PSL has only held four matches in this stadium during the fourth season in 2019, but has not held any ceremonies.

Pakistan 

 Lahore: The Gaddafi Stadium was the first Pakistani stadium to host PSL matches, and it holds a capacity of 27,000. It has hosted 17 PSL matches. Both the 2017 final and the closing ceremony were held at this stadium.
 Karachi: The National Stadium holds a capacity of 34,000. It has hosted 17 PSL matches and three ceremonies.
 Rawalpindi: The Rawalpindi Cricket Stadium holds a capacity of 15,000. It has hosted three PSL matches, all coming in the 2020 season, but has not held any ceremonies.
 Multan: The Multan Cricket Stadium holds a capacity of 35,000. It has hosted three PSL matches, but has not held any ceremonies.

Lists

General list

By matches played

By ceremonies held

See also 
 List of Pakistan Super League anthems
 List of Pakistan Super League records and statistics

References 

venues